Encyclopedia of Mathematics is a 2005 encyclopedic reference work by American author James Tanton that was published by Facts-on-File of New York.

Synopsis
The book has over 1000 entries, which discuss various concepts, definitions, people, and theorems that pertain to mathematics. The book also contains six essays that discuss the various branches of mathematics and their history.

Reception
Booklist praised the book as a useful "basic resource for students who wish to have a better understanding of simple or not-so--simple mathematical concepts" and the School Library Journal called the encyclopedia "comprehensive".

References

External links

 

2005 non-fiction books
Encyclopedias of mathematics